The 1972 Polish Speedway season was the 1972 season of motorcycle speedway in Poland.

Individual

Polish Individual Speedway Championship
The 1972 Individual Speedway Polish Championship final was held on 1 October at Bydgoszcz.

Golden Helmet
The 1972 Golden Golden Helmet organised by the Polish Motor Union (PZM) was the 1972 event for the league's leading riders.

Calendar

Final classification
Note: Result from final score was subtracted with two the weakest events.

Junior Championship
 winner - Bernard Jąder

Silver Helmet
 winner - Andrzej Tkocz

Team

Team Speedway Polish Championship
The 1972 Team Speedway Polish Championship was the 1972 edition of the Team Polish Championship. 

KS ROW Rybnik won the gold medal. The team included Antoni Woryna, Jerzy Gryt and Andrzej Wyglenda.

First League

Second League

References

Poland Individual
Poland Team
Speedway
1972 in Polish speedway